Gordon Archbold Slater  D.Mus. FRCO (1896–1979) was an English cathedral organist, who served in Leicester Cathedral and Lincoln Cathedral.

He was a composer of organ, piano and choral music.

Hymn Tunes

Three hymn tunes appear in well-known and well-used books. 'St Botolph' is very widely sung to the words "Jesu the Very Thought of Thee" (or "To Mary, Mother of our God")   'Bilsdale' was sung by generations of children to the words "I love God's tiny creatures" whilst 'Fountains Abbey' with an 8.4.8.4.10.10. metre alternates between triple and duple time.

One of his pupils was Dennis Townhill, later organist of St Mary's Episcopal Cathedral, Edinburgh.

Career
Slater was an organist of St Botolph's Church, Boston (1919–1927), Leicester Cathedral (1927–1931) and Lincoln Cathedral (1931–1966).

References

1896 births
1979 deaths
English classical organists
British male organists
Cathedral organists
20th-century classical musicians
20th-century English musicians
20th-century organists
20th-century British male musicians
Male classical organists